Francesco Scorsa (born 17 December 1946) is an Italian former footballer who played as a defender and a football manager.

Career 
Scorsa played in the Serie D in 1966 with A.S.D. Cervia 1920. In 1968, he played in the Serie B with Cesena F.C. after four seasons with Cesena he played in the Serie A with Bologna F.C. 1909. He made his Serie A debut on 1 October 1972 against Inter Milan. The following season he played with Foggia Calcio, and later with Ascoli Calcio 1898 F.C. In 1976, he returned to the Serie B with Ascoli, and secured promotion to the Serie A by winning the Serie B in 1977-78.

In 1982, he played abroad in the National Soccer League with Toronto Italia on a loan deal. In 1983, he played in the Serie C2 with Ravenna F.C.

Managerial career 
Scorsa became a head coach in 1985 with U.S. Catanzaro 1929. He managed teams in the Serie B such as Messina, and A.S.D. Licata 1931. He also managed Alma Juventus Fano 1906, A.S.D. F.C. S.S. Nola 1925, Vigor Lamezia, S.S.D. Casarano Calcio, and Ascoli Calcio 1898 F.C.

References  

1946 births
Living people
Association football defenders
Italian football managers
Italian footballers
Cesena F.C. players
Bologna F.C. 1909 players
Calcio Foggia 1920 players
Ascoli Calcio 1898 F.C. players
Toronto Italia players
Ravenna F.C. players
Serie A players
Serie B players
Serie C players
Serie D players
Canadian National Soccer League players
U.S. Catanzaro 1929 managers
Alma Juventus Fano 1906 managers
Ascoli Calcio 1898 F.C. managers
Serie B managers